Alfredo De Villa is a Mexican director. He is best known for directing award winning films such as Adrift in Manhattan, which was nominated for the Grand Jury Prize at the Sundance Film Festival in 2007, and Washington Heights, which won a special mention for directing and acting at the Tribeca Film Festival.

Early life 
De Villa was born in Puebla, Mexico. He earned his Bachelor of Arts from the University of Miami and his Master of Fine Arts from the film division of Columbia University, with an emphasis in directing.

Career
De Villa's two short films, Joe’s Egg and Neto’s Run were both awarded the Best Latino Director Award from the Directors Guild of America in 1995 and 1999, he is the only filmmaker to be awarded this honor twice. De Villa has gone on to direct many acclaimed feature films.

Personal life
De Villa currently resides in Los Angeles, California.

Filmography

Film 
 Fugly! (2013)
 Harlistas: An American Journey (2011)
 Nothing like the Holidays (2008)
 Adrift in Manhattan (2007)
 Yellow (2006)
 Washington Heights (2002)
 Neto's Run (1998)
 Joe's Egg (1995)

Awards and nominations 
Sundance Film Festival

 Nominated, Grand Jury Prize: Adrift in Manhattan (2007)

San Diego Film Festival

 Winner, Best Director: Adrift in Manhattan (2007)

Indianapolis International Film Festival

 Winner, Best Narrative Feature: Adrift in Manhattan (2007)

Gotham Awards

 Nominated, Open Palm Award: Washington Heights (2003)

Austin Film Festival

 Winner, Best Feature Film Washington Heights (2002)

Los Angeles Film Festival

 Winner, Audience Award, Best Feature Film Washington Heights (2002)

Tribeca Film Festival

 Winner, Special Mention for Washington Heights (2002)

References

External links 

Sundance Profiles, Alfredo De Villa

Mexican film directors
Living people
People from Puebla
Mexican screenwriters
Male screenwriters
Year of birth missing (living people)